The Women's Senior One Day Trophy, previously known as the Senior Women's One Day League, is a women's List A cricket tournament held in India. It began in the 2006–07 season, with 24 teams representing state cricket associations, whilst the most recent season, 2022–23, had 37 teams competing. Railways have won the tournament 14 times, including the first and most recent season, whilst Delhi and Bengal have won the tournament once apiece.

History
The tournament, as the Senior Women's One Day League, began in the 2006–07 season, the first competition involving state teams in India since the Senior National Women's Cricket Championship, a combined List A and first-class competition that ended in 2002–03. The first tournament was won by Railways, who beat Maharashtra in the final by 7 wickets.

Railways went on to dominate the competition, winning the first five competitions before their run was ended in 2011–12 by Delhi, who beat Hyderabad in the final. Railways regained their title the following season, however, starting another dominant run in which they won six titles in a row. In 2018–19, Bengal won their first title, beating Railways in the semi-final before defeating Andhra in the final.

Ahead of the 2019–20 season, the tournament was renamed the Women's Senior One Day Trophy. The season was eventually curtailed due to the COVID-19 pandemic, with the knockout stages cancelled and therefore no overall winner declared. The tournament returned for 2020–21, with Railways again winning the title, their twelfth. They won their thirteenth title in 2021–22, beating Karnataka in the final. The same final was repeated in 2022–23, with Railways again winning the tournament.

The tournament ran alongside a first-class state competition, the Inter State Women's Competition, in 2007–08 and 2008–09 and has run alongside the Senior Women's T20 League since 2008–09.

Competition format
The Women's Senior One Day Trophy has used various formats across the years. In the first season, 2006–07, 24 state teams competed in round-robin groups across five zones, Central, East, North, South and West, with the top two from each group advancing to the knockout stages. For the following season, the amount of teams in the competition expanded to 27, with the addition of Bengal, Sikkim and Tripura but retained the same format with slightly expanded groups. 

In 2008–09, the amount of teams expanded again, to 28, with the addition of Manipur. The format also changed, with the top two from each zonal group now advanced to a further group stage, with two "Super Leagues" of five teams apiece, with the winners of these leagues advancing to the final. The following season retained the same format, but was reduced to 26 teams, with the departure of Sikkim and Manipur. The format remained the same until the end of the 2012–13 season. 

For the 2013–14 season, the 26 teams were arranged into an Elite Group and a Plate Group, then further divided into Elite Groups A and B and Plate Groups A, B and C. The top two from each Plate Group went into a knockout round, with the two finalists playing for the Plate Group title whilst also both gaining promotion to the Elite Group for the following season. Meanwhile, the top two from each Elite Group went into a Super League of four teams, with the winner being crowned the Champions of the tournament. The format was retained until the end of the 2017–18, with the only adjustment being for the addition of Chhattisgarh ahead of the 2016–17 season.

Ahead of the 2018–19 season, nine teams were added to the competition: newly added were Arunachal Pradesh, Bihar, Meghalaya, Mizoram, Nagaland, Pondicherry and Uttarakand, as well as the returning Manipur and Sikkim. The format was also changed, with the 27 original teams competing in three Elite Groups, with eight progressing to knockout stages, and the 10 new teams competing in the Plate Group, with the winner being promoted to the Elite Group for the following season. The format was retained for the following season, 2019–20 (with the addition of Chandigarh), but the knockout stages were cancelled due to the COVID-19 pandemic.

Alterations to the format, partly due to COVID-19 protocols, for the 2020–21 season meant that three teams were promoted from the Plate Group from the previous season. The 30 teams in the Elite Group were then divided into 5 groups of 6, with a Plate Group of 7 teams. The winners and two best second-placed teams then went straight into the knockout stages, with the third best second-placed team playing off against the winner of the Plate Group for the final quarter-final spot. The format was slightly altered for the 2021–22 season, with the top two teams from each Elite Group proceeding to the knockout stages, along with the winner of the Plate Group. The winners of each Elite Group progressed straight to the quarter-finals, whilst the other six teams played off in the pre-quarter-finals. The format was again altered for the 2022–23, with all teams now divided into five groups, with group winners progressing directly to the quarter-finals, and the second-placed teams and the best third-placed teams progressing to the pre-quarter-finals.

Matches are played using a one day format with 50 overs per side. In the most recent edition of the tournament, teams received 4 points for a win, 2 for a tie, no result or abandonment, and 0 for a loss. Positions in the tables was determined firstly by points, then by wins, then by head-to-head record and finally by Net Run Rate.

Teams

Tournament results

References

 
Indian domestic cricket competitions
Women's cricket competitions in India
List A cricket competitions
Limited overs cricket
2006 establishments in India
Cricket